Charles Read may refer to:

 Charles Read (Australian politician) (1814–1910), politician in Geelong, Victoria, Australia
 Charles A. Read (1837–1865), American Civil War sailor and Medal of Honor recipient
 Charles Read (Medal of Honor) (1840–?), American Civil War sailor and Medal of Honor recipient
 Charles Read (naval officer) (1840–1890), American, lieutenant in the Confederate States Navy
 Charles Anderson Read (1841–1878), Irish writer
 Sir Charles Hercules Read (1857–1929), British archaeologist and curator
 Charles C. Reid (1868–1922), Arkansas lawyer and politician
 Charles Read (squash player) (1889–?), British professional squash player
 Charles Read (RAAF officer) (1918–2014), commander in the Royal Australian Air Force
 Charles Read (mathematician) (1958–2015), British mathematician
 Sir Charles D. Read (1902–1957), New Zealand surgeon
 Charles Read (Philadelphia) (died 1736), merchant and mayor of Philadelphia

See also
 Charles Reade (disambiguation)
 Charles Reed (disambiguation)
 Charles Reid (disambiguation)